The 1941–42 Serie C was the seventh edition of Serie C, the third highest league in the Italian football league system.

Legend

Girone A

Girone B

Girone C

Girone D

Girone E

Girone F

Girone G

Girone H

Final rounds

Girone A

Girone B

Serie C seasons
3
Italy